Parisian Sketches is an album by American jazz drummer Max Roach recorded in Paris in 1960 and released on the Mercury label.

Track listing
All compositions by Max Roach except as indicated
 "Parisian Sketches: The Tower/The Champs/The Caves/The Left Bank/The Arch" - 17:13   
 "Nica" (Sonny Clark) - 4:48   
 "Petit Déjeuner" (Julian Priester) - 4:06   
 "Un Nouveau Complet" (Tommy Turrentine) - 3:25   
 "Liberte" - 6:25
Recorded at Barclay Studios, Paris, France on March 1, 1960 (tracks 1, 3 & 4), and March 2, 1960 (tracks 2 & 5)

Personnel 
Max Roach - drums
Tommy Turrentine - trumpet 
Julian Priester - trombone 
Stanley Turrentine  - tenor saxophone 
Bob Boswell  - bass

References 

1960 albums
Max Roach albums
Mercury Records albums